Jacki Apple (1941-2022) was an American artist, writer, composer, producer and educator based in New York City. She worked in multiple disciplines such as performance art and installation art. As well as art making, Apple was also a writer, penning around 200 reviews and critical essays on topics such as performance art, media arts, installation art and dance. Her writing has appeared in publications such as Performing Arts Journal, Public Art Review and The Drama Review.

Early career 
As a fashion designer she worked mainly with the effects of disguise on other people, or in relation to herself. “Transfers/Exchanges” (exploring [Freud's idea of] the four people in every relationship between ’s self as defined by others’ perceptions.) Soliciting opinions about her appearance from others and documenting them  evolved into a new form of self-portrait.

Artworks 
Her work deals with memory, history, and the interface between nature and culture, the relationship between matter and consciousness, and historical, biological, and geological time, as well as political and social issues. Loss, disappearances, and dislocations are often underlying themes.

The interdisciplinary performance The Amazon, The Mekong, The Missouri and the Nile (1985), a discourse on the nature of colonialism was conceived by artist/writer Jacki Apple, choreographer Mary Jane Eisenberg, and composer/musician Bruce Fowler.

Since 1990 she explored subjects such as species extinction (The Culture of Disappearance ) and natural disasters (You Don't Need A Weatherman). Archaeology, paleontology, theoretical and astrophysics, earth sciences, and the politics of culture, music and dance have been influential sources. (1).  Apple chose physicist David Bohm's Wholeness and the Implicate Order upon which to base her performance spectacle Fluctuations of the Field., “and it is nothing less than a demonstration, in the language of avant-garde performance, of the nature of reality in both its physical and social manifestations.”

Audio and radio 

Apple worked on inserting the artist's voice into mass media as well as creating works for installations and performances. Her text/sound/music audio and radio works consist of layered intersecting textual and sonic narratives, and have been broadcast worldwide. She has approached aural space as a multi-dimensional place equivalent to three-dimensional visual space, and radio as a performance space. She creates hybrid forms—talking pictures, orchestrated texts and sonic architecture, to create a perceptual shift and transport the listener to someplace unexpected. The recording studio has been her compositional instrument, and she views producing as a compositional art form.

Works commissioned by New Radio and Performing Arts for New America Radio include the collaborative six-part radio series Redefining Democracy in America 1991–92. In Parts 1, 2, & 3: Episodes in Black and White(1991) Apple and collaborating writer/performers Linda Albertano, Keith Antar Mason, and Akilah Nayo Oliver explored issues of race, sex, money, power, drugs, family, children, violence, language and censorship, and raised questions about who speaks, who is listened to, who is heard, who is silenced. Parts 4 & 5: The Voices of America 1992 produced with KPFK-FM, Los Angeles, posed the questions "What would you say to your fellow citizens if you were running for president? What should we aspire to and how should we get there?" providing a forum for Americans across the political and cultural spectrum to speak to fellow listeners. In Part 6: A Leap of Faith (1992) with writer, performer Keith Antar Mason, a white American woman and an African-American man born in America in the middle of the twentieth century on opposite sides of the dividing line, take an imaginary journey through time.

 1989  Swan Lake
 1991  The Culture of Disappearance
 1991  Voices in the Dark
 1997  You Don't Need A Weatherman

Co-produced by sound artist Jacki Apple and Julie Adler, the annual EARJAM new music festival was an eclectic sonic cavalcade featuring around thirty local musicians in the adventurous jazz, contemporary and experimental realms from 2000 to 2004 at Side Street Live, the Armory Northwest, and  REDCAT in Los Angeles. The diverse programs included instrumentalists, vocalists, and improvisers, acoustics and electronics, solos and duets. Each of two sets ended in “jams” adding to the collective whole.

Discography 
 1978  Black Holes/Blue Sky Dreams, Airwaves, 110 Records, N.Y. LP
 1980  The Mexican Tapes, LP, 110 Records, New York
 1983  Idaho (Free Fire Zone) High Performance #23, Astro Artz, L.A. LP 
 1983  The Garden Planet Revisited (excerpts) Live to Air, Audio Arts, London
 1992  Episodes in Black & White Part 1 (compilation/excerpt)  SiteLess Sound Tellus  #25, Harvestworks, N.Y. CD 
 1993 "Voices in the Dark” Radius # 2, Nonsequitur (record label), Albuquerque, N.M. CD
 1995  Thank You For Flying American, Stories and songs 1980-1992, retrospective CD, Cactus/Chronic Interactive, Los Angeles
 1995  ghost.dances\on the event horizon, CD, Cactus/Chronic Interactive, Los Angeles
 1996  “A Leap of Faith” (excerpt) Voice Tears, The Drama Review, NYC 
 1998  You Don't Need A Weatherman (excerpt), RAS 3, Centro de Creacion Experimental Taller de Sonido, Cuenca, Spain

Awards and recognition 

 2012 College Art Association recipient Distinguished Teaching of Art Award
 Durfee Foundation Visual Arts Grant 2008, 2003
 Art Center College of Design Faculty Enrichment Grant 2014, 2007, 2001
 L.A. Dept. of Cultural Affairs, Public Arts Commissions 2001, 2000, 1999, 1997
 California Arts Council Artists Fellowship New Genres 1996
 National Endowment for the Arts Inter-Arts grant 1991-92
 Los Angeles Cultural Affairs Media Arts grant 1990
 VESTA Award in Media Arts 1990
 Santa Monica Arts Commission Grant 1989
 National/State/County Partnership project grant 1987, 1989
 National Endowment for the Arts Inter-Arts grant 1984, 1992
 New York State Council on the Arts Multimedia grant 1981
 National Endowment for the Arts Visual Arts Fellowship 1981,1979
 NEA Museum Program project grant 1980
 ZBS Foundation Residency Grant 1978

References

External links
  Guide to the Jacki Apple Papers 1984-2000
  Julie Adler by Jackie Apple

Living people
American women performance artists
American performance artists
American women installation artists
American installation artists
Art Center College of Design faculty
Artists from Pasadena, California
Feminist artists
Parsons School of Design alumni
20th-century American women artists
21st-century American women artists
American women academics
1941 births